This is a list of close election results on the national level and within administrative divisions. It lists results that have been decided by a margin of less than 1 vote in 1,000 (a margin of less than 0.1 percentage points): single-winner elections where the winning candidate was less than 0.1 ahead of the second-placed candidate, as well as party-list elections where a party was less than 0.1% short of the electoral threshold or two lists that obtained seats are less than 0.1 Percentage points apart. This list is limited to elections in which at least 1,000 votes were cast.

To provide context, the section on "Distribution of elections" shows the distribution of winning margins in different areas. Depending on the area, from 1 in 40 to 1 in 500 election contests is decided by less than 1 vote in 1,000.

According to a 2001 study of state and federal elections in the United States between 1898 and 1992, "one of every 100,000 votes cast in U.S. elections, and one of every 15,000 votes cast in state elections, "mattered" in the sense that they were cast for a candidate that officially tied or won by one vote."

While not an election, a member of Congress once owed his seat to the drawing of lots. In 1902, after more than 7,000 votes at three conventions, the Democrats were unable to decide among three candidates for nomination to Texas's 12th congressional district. Two candidates put their names in a hat, drew one out and the loser agreed to withdraw and support the winner. Oscar W. Gillespie won the game of lots, the nomination and the following general election, serving in Congress for eight years.

There are a variety of ways in which tied elections are settled. Some are decided by drawing lots or other games of chances. Others lead to a runoff or special election. Still others are decided by some third party such as the legislature or a high-ranking elected official. In one case in Waynetown, Indiana, in 1891, two candidates for town treasurer agreed to settle their 339–339 tie by a foot-race. However, despite some fictionalized accounts, the town board overruled the agreement and determined that then-incumbent William Simms would remain in office for another term, and the proposed race never occurred.

Table of close national and state elections

Tied elections

List of close election results in single-winner, majoritarian and STV races

List of close election results between parties passing the threshold in party-list proportional races

List of parties close to the threshold in proportional races

Distribution of elections by winning margin
Close elections not only demonstrate the effect of individual voters, they may reflect extra efforts from candidates or supporters when elections are close.

In the United States in 2018, 88 state legislative elections were decided by less than half a percent.

See also
Election audits
Elections
Electoral integrity
List of controversial elections

Notes

References

Close